Rhabdodon (meaning "fluted tooth") is a genus of ornithopod dinosaur that lived in Europe approximately 70-66 million years ago in the Late Cretaceous. It is similar in build to a very robust "hypsilophodont" (non-iguanodont ornithopod), though all modern phylogenetic analyses find this to be an unnatural grouping, and Rhabdodon to be a basal member of Iguanodontia.

Discovery
 
Two species of Rhabdodon are known, Rhabdodon priscus, the type species, and R. septimanicus (Buffetaut and Le Loeuff, 1991). Rhabdodon remains are currently known from southern France, although fragmentary remains from eastern Spain have been assigned to the genus. Rhabdodon was large compared to its nearest relatives, and indeed one recent paper ( Ősi et al. (2012)) determined it is larger than the basal rhabdodontid status; from this they suggested that it actually experienced gigantism on the "mainland"; and not insular dwarfism as previous suggested.

Paleobiology

Rhabdodon was probably an important herbivore in Cretaceous Europe. Rhabdodon's predators include the abelisaurid Arcovenator, and young may have been prey for Pyroraptor.

Paleoecology
Rhabdodon priscus is known from a specimen from the Marnes Rouges Inférieures Formation. The material of Rhabdodon priscus includes a dentary and many other postcranial remains. More specifically, it is known from the Bellevue layer, which has produced many vertebrate fossils. Even though it produced many vertebrates, the formation only has a scarce record of plants and invertebrates. The non-dinosaurian vertebrates consist of Lepisosteus, an indeterminate turtle, and a crocodile. Dinosaurian fauna from the Marnes Rouges Inférieures Formation include Ampelosaurus, an animal classified as Dromaeosauridae indet., and an indeterminate ankylosaur. The bird Gargantuavis philoinos, and dinosaur eggs have also been recovered.
 
Another formation Rhabdodon priscus is known from is Gres de Saint-Chinian. Along with both Rhabdodon priscus, Rhabdodon septimanicus, dinosaur eggs, Nodosauridae indet. (previously known as Rhodanosaurus lugdunensis), Theropoda indet., Variraptor mechinorum, Avialae indet., Enantiornithes indet., and a possible Abelisauridae indet. are known from this formation.

Rhabdodon priscus is one of few vertebrates known from the Gres de Labarre Formation. The only other fossils from the formation belong to Ampelosaurus atacis and a Nodosauridae indet.

Villalba de la Sierra Formation

Rhabdodon sp. is from the latest Cretaceous aged Lo Hueco region in the Villalba de la Sierra Formation. A study shows that the area around Lo Hueco dates to the late Campanian and early Maastrichtian, although a more recent study revised the later date to the latest Maastrichtian. The study showed that Lo Hueco was near the coast of the Tethys Sea, a large seaway through southern Europe and northern Africa. The area directly on the coast was shown to be a brackish-freshwater aquatic environment, with a muddy flood-plain beside it. Lo Hueco was found to be inside the flood-plain. The flood plain was found to have distributary channels of sand and terrigenous material.

Many dinosaurs have been found in the Villalba de la Sierra Formation, including Rhabdodon sp. They consist of possible Lirainosaurus remains, Ampelosaurus atacis, unknown basal euornithopods, probable ankylosaurians, one undetermined dromaeosaurine, and one unknown velociraptorine. The plants known from the formation are represented by carbonized branches and leaves. Invertebrates are solely known from bivalves and gastropods. Fishes from the formation include lepisosteids, and unidentified actinopterygians and teleosteans. Turtle fossils are very common, but only two different groups have been identified, the bothremydids Polysternon and Rosasia, along with an undetermined Pancryptodiran. Squamate lizards are known only from a few undetermined specimens, and eusuchian crocodiles are known from a specimen with similarities to Allodaposuchus and Musturzabalsuchus.

Classification
 
The cladogram below is based on the analysis of Ösi et al. (2012):

References

Further reading 

 Brinkmann, W., 1986. Rhabdodon Matheron, 1869 (Reptilia, Ornithischia): Proposed conservation by suppression of Rhabdodon Fleischmann, 1831 (Reptilia, Serpentes). Case 2536. Bulletin of Zoological Nomenclature 43: 269-272
 ICZN, 1988. Opinion 1483. Rhabdodon Matheron, 1869 (Reptilia, Ornithischia): Conserved. Bulletin of Zoological Nomenclature 45: 85-86

Iguanodonts
Maastrichtian life
Late Cretaceous dinosaurs of Europe
Cretaceous France
Fossils of France
Cretaceous Romania
Fossils of Romania
Cretaceous Spain
Fossils of Spain
Tremp Formation
Fossil taxa described in 1869
Ornithischian genera